Making Time is the second studio album by British singer Jamie Woon. It was released on 6 November 2015 through Polydor Records. It was preceded by the single "Sharpness" on 21 August 2015. Making Time was nominated for the 2016 Mercury Prize.

Critical reception
At Metacritic, which assigns a weighted average score out of 100 to reviews from mainstream critics, Making Time received an average score of 71 out of 100 based on 12 reviews, indicating "generally favorable reviews".

Britt Julious of Pitchfork gave the album a 7.4 out of 10, describing it as "a testament to the strength of traditional music composition: simple guitars, slinky bass lines, and sophisticated songwriting." Lanre Bakare of The Guardian gave the album 4 stars out of 5, writing, "Woon might have been expected to return with a dancefloor-focused second album, but instead he's taken the soul road, and it sounds like a brilliant statement of intent."

NPR named it one of the "Top 10 Slept-On R&B Albums of 2015".

Track listing

Charts

References

External links
 

2015 albums
Jamie Woon albums